Lake Columbia is a man-made lake in Columbia Township in southern Jackson County in the U.S. state of Michigan. At its greatest extent, the lake is 2 and 1/4 miles long and 1 and 3/4 miles wide.

Lake Columbia is one of the many lakes in Jackson County that is entirely private.  Yearly membership dues in the Lake Columbia Property Owners Association are required by residents of the lake.  The lake has a total of 16 private parks.  It also has 14 named shores where residents reside.  It is a boaters and fishers paradise for local residents of the lake.  Lake Columbia is stocked annually with Walleye or Bluegill fish.  The fish population continues to grow in Lake Columbia every year.

Hydrology

Lake Columbia has a primary inflow from Goose Creek and a primary outflow from Goose Creek.  Goose Creek mainly flows from east to west and flows into the Raisin River.  The Raisin River connects Clark Lake, Vineyard Lake, Norvell Lake and Lake Columbia together by way of Goose Creek also.  The drainage area of Lake Columbia is 25,000 Sq. Acres which drains into Jackson County and Hillsdale County, Michigan.

Natural history

The natural wildlife that surround and inhabit Lake Columbia are White Tail Deer, Walleye fish, Bluegill fish, Red Foxes, and Common Loons.

History

Prior to 1960
By 1836, with the dam completed and the mills in operation, the small village of Jefferson was platted. Soon after, a post office was opened and the name was changed to Columbia, as the name Jefferson had already been taken. The original village was located near the intersection of Jefferson Rd and Hewitt Rd, a portion of which was later rerouted when the lake was expanded.

1960 to 1999
In September 1960, after an intensive study by American Central Corporation of Lansing, Michigan, the people in the Lake Columbia area, which was then mostly farmland, were contacted and their farms purchased. The company was looking to sell attractive land around a private lake. Construction started in July 1961 on the earthen L-shaped dam that now stops the flow of Goose Creek. By early Autumn, the dam was completed and attention shifted to clearing the wooded portions of the basin.

2000 to present
Currently the association boasts more than 1,600 members. There are more than 700 lakefront homes, and nearly 650 more near the lake which are still considered part of the Lake Columbia Association. Homes around the lake range in price from $50,000 to over $1 million.  The privacy of Lake Columbia is kept up through annual membership dues required every year.  As of 2011, the membership dues are $360 for the first lot owned, and $40 for each additional lot.

Each year Lake Columbia offers many events around and on the lake.  There are community-oriented events year-round, including fishing tournaments, an annual community-wide garage sale, a golf league, block parties, annual LCPOA picnic, Light Up the Night Weekend, outdoor movie at a park, a rotation of food trucks at the parks throughout the summer, and "trunk-or-treat" at Halloween.  Wintertime activities include snowmobiling, ice hockey for kids, ice skating and ice fishing.

Lake Columbia also has one of the most spectacular Fourth of July fireworks displays around Jackson County.  It is set up through the Lake Columbia Property Owners Association, and is funded through private donations and the LCPOA.

Parks around Lake Columbia
Private parks located around Lake Columbia:

 Archwood - Located off Archwood Circle (off Somerset Dr.)
 Bedford, East - Located off Bedford Dr.
 Bedford, West - Located off Bedford Dr.
 Castlewood - Located off Castlewood Dr.(off Wesch Rd.)
 Claremont - Located off Claremont Circle
 Donald - Located off Claremont Circle
 Grand Pointe - Located off Grand Pointe Dr.
 Hawthorne - Located at the end of Hawthorne / Waverly Ct
 Hilltop - Located at end of Hilltop Ct.(off Nottingham)
 Karen Court - Located off Somerset Dr.
 Kelley - Located off Kelley Rd.
 Nottingham - Located at the end of Nottingham
 Princess - Located off Princess Dr.- across the channel from Archwood Park (off Somerset Dr)
 Riviera - Located off Riviera Dr.(off Kelly Rd.)
 Somerset - Located off Somerset Dr.(off Hayes Rd.)
 Southern Shores - Located off Southern Shores Dr

Local towns and areas
 Brooklyn (located east )  Population (2000) 1,176
 Cement City (located southwest ) Population (2000) 452
 Clark Lake (Jackson County, Michigan) - located north 
 Jackson (located north approximately ) Population (2000) City: 36,316 - Metro Area: 163,629
 Napoleon (located north east ) Population (2000) 1,254

Local points of interest

Golf Courses

Golf Courses, parks and many other recreational activities surround the lake and provide a person with things to do year round.  Lake Columbia is located closely to the Irish Hills, Michigan International Speedway and the downtown area of Brooklyn.  There are over 14 different challenging golf courses within  of Lake Columbia.

State and local parks

 Clark Lake Park
 Vineyard Lake County Park
 Walter J. Hayes State Park
 Cambridge Junction Historic St. Park

Points of interest

 Michigan International Speedway
 Hidden Lake Gardens
 Irish Hills

External links
 Lake Columbia Website
 Michigan International Speedway Website

References

Columbia
Bodies of water of Jackson County, Michigan